Jeff Voris (born August 27, 1967) is an American college football coach and former  player.  He was most recently the head football coach at Butler University, a position he had held since the 2006 season, through the 2021 season.  Voris served as the head football coach at Carroll College in Waukesha, Wisconsin from 2001 to 2005.  He played as quarterback at  DePauw University from 1986 to 1989.

Playing career
Voris was a four-year starting quarterback at DePauw University from 1986 through 1989 and earned honorable mention All-America recognition in 1988 and 1989.  As of 2007, he still holds DePauw career football records for most passing yards (6,035), most touchdown passes (56), most pass completions (504), most pass attempts (910) and most total offense (5,754).

His other accomplishments on the field at DePauw include single game records with 38 completions against Findlay in 1987 and five touchdown passes against Taylor in 1988, and he's the only player in DePauw football history to lead the Tigers in passing for four consecutive seasons. While at DePauw he joined Delta Tau Delta International Fraternity.

Coaching career

Carroll
Voris' first head football coaching position was as the 27th head football coach at Carroll College in Waukesha, Wisconsin, serving for five seasons, from 2001 to 2005, and compiling 15–34.

Butler
From 2006 to 2021 Voris was the head coach at Butler University.

The Bulldogs won the 2009 Pioneer Football League title by compiling a 7–1 league record and a 10–1 regular season overall.  The conference title run included a come-from-behind 25–24 victory over Pioneer League preseason favorite San Diego, a 31–28 road win at Dayton (who also finished with a 7–1 league record), and a 20–17 title-clinching victory over Drake.

The Pioneer Football League title earned the Bulldogs a berth in the last Gridiron Classic. It was Butler's first postseason appearance since 1991, when they were still an NCAA Division II program. Butler defeated Central Connecticut State 28–23 to win the Gridiron Classic and finish 11–1.

Head coaching record

References

External links
 Butler profile

1967 births
Living people
American football quarterbacks
Butler Bulldogs football coaches
Carroll Pioneers football coaches
DePauw Tigers football coaches
DePauw Tigers football players
Edinboro Fighting Scots football coaches
Illinois Fighting Illini football coaches
Texas Longhorns football coaches
Sportspeople from Aurora, Illinois